Sunsets on Empire is a studio album by Fish, the fourth with original material since he left Marillion in 1988. It was mostly written together with Steven Wilson of Porcupine Tree, who co-composed six out of ten tracks on the original version, (plus one bonus track on the Japanese and remastered edition) and also produced the album. Tim Bowness, Wilson's partner in No-Man, has additional writing credits on one track. Two permanent members of Fish's line-up, keyboardist Foster Paterson, and guitarist Robin Boult co-wrote one and two tracks, respectively.

Unfortunately, the album and tour were flops and lost Fish hundreds of thousands of pounds, which meant he had to fold his Dick Brothers label.  Roadrunner and Chocolate Frog/Snapper would subsequently reissue the album.

Track listing
 "The Perception of Johnny Punter" (Derek Dick, Steven Wilson) – 8:36
 "Goldfish & Clowns" (Dick, Wilson) – 6:36
 "Change of Heart" (Dick, Robin Boult) – 3:41
 "What Colour Is God?" (Dick, Wilson) – 5:50
 "Tara" (Dick, Foster Paterson) – 5:11
 "Jungle Ride" (Dick, Boult) – 7:33
 "Worm in a Bottle" (Dick, Boult) – 6:23
 "Brother 52" (Dick, Wilson) – 6:05
 "Sunsets on Empire" (Dick, Wilson) – 6:54
 "Say It with Flowers" (Dick, Wilson, Tim Bowness) – 4:15
Total time: 61:04

Bonus track on the Japanese and remastered version
<LI>"Do Not Walk Outside This Area" (Dick, Wilson) – 6:29
Total time: 67:34

2015 The Remasters edition
Disc One Original studio album

Disc Two Demos with Steven Wilson + bonus tracks
 "Goldfish and Clowns (demo)" – 6:37
 "Sunsets on Empire (demo)" – 6:53
 "What Colour Is God? (demo)" – 5:57
 "Do Not Walk Outside This Area (demo)" – 6:11
 "The Perception of Johnny Punter (demo)" – 8:34
 "Say It with Flowers (demo)" – 4:11
 "The Perception of Johnny Punter (USA version)" – 8:38
 "Do Not Walk Outside This Area" – 6:29
 "Tara (radio edit)" – 4:03
 "Goldfish and Clowns (radio edit)" – 4:14
 "What Colour Is God? (Max Rael remix)" – 7:01
Total time: 68:44

Disc Three Live
 "Change of Heart (live Haddington 2006)" – 3:44
 "Tara (live Haddington 2006)" – 5:30
 "Worm in a Bottle (live Haddington 2006)" – 5:20
 "Goldfish and Clowns (live Haddington 1998)" – 6:44
 "Jungle Ride (live Poland 1997)" – 8:09
 "The Perception of Johnny Punter (live Poland 1997)" – 11:15
 "What Colour Is God? (live Poland 1997)" – 5:53
 "Brother 52 (live Poland 1997)" – 6:07
 "Sunsets on Empire (live Poland 1999)" – 8:59
Total time: 61:34

Personnel
 Fish – lead vocals (all)
 Steven Wilson – lead guitar (1, 10), rhythm guitar (1, 8, 9), keyboards (1-6, 8-10), string arrangement (1), loops/sampler (2, 4, 5, 8)
 Robin Boult – rhythm guitar (1-4, 6-9), 12 string guitar (1-6, 8, 10), lead guitar (5, 8), e-bow (5, 8)
 Frank Usher – lead guitar (1, 7, 8), rhythm guitar (2-4, 7, 8)
 Foss Patterson – Hammond organ (1,2, 7-9), piano (1, 2, 5, 9), keyboards (3, 5, 6), backing vocals (4), string arrangement (5)
 Ewen Vernal – bass (1-9)
 Dave Stewart – drums (1-9)
 Chris Gaugh – cello (1, 5)
 Brian Hale – violin (1, 5)
 Dave Haswell – percussion (2, 5, 6)
 Martyn Bennett – violin (6, 8)
 Fraser Speirs (misspelled as "Spiers") – harmonica (6)
 "Doc" – voice on telephone (8)
 Terence Jones – French horn (9)
 Lorna Bannon – backing vocals (1, 2, 5, 9)
 Don Jack – backing vocals (1)
 Chris Thomson – backing vocals (1)
 Katherine Garrett – backing vocals (3, 6)
 Annie McCraig – backing vocals (9)

Charts

References

External links
Discography information on Fish's official website

1997 albums
Fish (singer) albums